Anthony Canham (born 8 June 1960) is an English former footballer who made more than 350 appearances in the Football League, mostly for York City.

Notes

External links

1960 births
Living people
Footballers from Leeds
English footballers
Association football wingers
Harrogate Railway Athletic F.C. players
York City F.C. players
Hartlepool United F.C. players
English Football League players